Charles Henry Poingdestre (1825 in Jersey – 1905 in London) was a painter. He stayed in Rome 30 years where he opened a paint studio in Via dei Greci, n. 36.
Some favourite subjects of his paintings were the "Campagna Romana" and the "Paludi Pontine".

Sixteen of his paintings are in UK public collections, including National Museums Liverpool, Nuneaton Art Gallery and Jersey Heritage.

References

Jersey artists
1825 births
1905 deaths
19th-century British painters
British male painters
20th-century British painters
19th-century British male artists
20th-century British male artists